The PocketStation is a memory card peripheral by Sony Computer Entertainment for the PlayStation home video game console. Categorized by Sony as a combination of a Memory Card and a miniature personal digital assistant, the device features a monochrome liquid crystal display (LCD), infrared communication capability, a real-time clock, built-in flash memory, and sound capability. To use the device's memory card functionality, it must be connected to a PlayStation through a memory card slot. It was released exclusively in Japan on January 23, 1999.

Software for the PocketStation was typically distributed as extras for PlayStation games, included in the CD-ROM, enhancing the games with added features. Standalone software could also be downloaded through the PlayStation console onto a memory card, then transferred to the PocketStation for use. A built-in infrared data interface allows direct transfer of data such as game saves between PocketStation units, as well as multiplayer gaming.

The original Japanese ship date for the PocketStation was set for December 23, 1998, but it was delayed a full month. Sony only shipped an initial 60,000 units of the peripheral when it was released on January 23, 1999. It was initially available in two case colors: white and clear. It proved extremely popular, selling out all over the region. Sony planned to release the PocketStation outside Japan, engaging in promotional activity in Europe and North America, but the release did not occur. SCEA cited an inability meeting Japanese demand as the reason for the PocketStation's absence. Despite this, a few games, such as Final Fantasy VIII and SaGa Frontier 2, retained PocketStation functionality in their localized versions.

The PocketStation's most popular game was Dokodemo Issho, which sold over 1.5 million copies in Japan and is the first game to star Sony's mascot Toro. The PocketStation was discontinued in July 2002 after having shipped nearly five million units.

On November 5, 2013, it was announced that the PocketStation would be revived as an application for the PlayStation Vita, allowing users to play PocketStation format minigames for any classic PlayStation games that they own. Originally only available to PlayStation Plus members, it was later released to the general public. It remains an exclusive to the Japanese PlayStation Vitas.

The PocketStation also shares similarities with Sega's VMU for the Dreamcast.

The PocketStation was available in 4 colors, white, black, clear, and pink clear.

Technical specifications
CPU: ARM7T (32-bit RISC chip)
Memory: 2K bytes SRAM, 128K bytes Flash RAM (via the PlayStation memory card)
Screen: 32×32 dot monochrome LCD
Sound: 1 miniature speaker (10-bit PCM)
Switches: 5 input buttons, 1 reset button
Infrared communication: Bi-directional (supports IrDA based and conventional remote control systems)
LED indicator: 1 (red)
Battery: 1 CR-2032 lithium battery
Other functions: calendar function, memory card and identification number.
Dimensions: 64 × 42 × 13.5 mm (height × width × depth)
Weight: Approximately 30g (including battery)
Available colors: White, Crystal/Clear, Black (Japanese Yu-Gi-Oh! Forbidden Memories Limited Edition), Crystal/Clear Pink/Clear Violet/Clear Red (Tokimeki Memorial 2 Limited Edition)

Compatible games
All Japan Pro Wrestling
Arc the Lad III
Armored Core: Master of Arena
Battle Bug Story
Be Pirates!
Boku wa Koukuu Kanseikan
Brightis
Burger Burger 2
Chaos Break
Chocobo Stallion
Crash Bandicoot 3: Warped
Dance Dance Revolution 3rdMix
Dance Dance Revolution 4thMix
Dance Dance Revolution 5thMix
Devil Summoner: Soul Hackers
Digimon Tamers: Pocket Culumon
Dokodemo Hamster 2
Dokodemo Issho
Final Fantasy VIII
Fire Pro G
Fish Hunter
fun! fun! Pingu
Gallop Racer 3
Grandia
Harvest Moon: Back to Nature
Hello Kitty: White Present
Hot Shots Golf 2
I.Q. Final
Jade Cocoon: Story of the Tamamayu
JoJo's Bizarre Adventure
Koneko mo Issho
Kyro-chan's Print Club
The Legend of Dragoon (Japanese version)
Legend of Mana
Love Hina 2
Lunatic Dawn 3
LMA Manager
Medarot R Parts Collection
Metal Gear Solid: Integral
Mister Prospector
The Misadventures of Tron Bonne
Monster Race
Monster Farm 2
Monster World
Paqa
Pi to Mail
Pocket Digimon World
Pocket Digimon World: Cool & Nature Battle Disc
Pocket Digimon World: Wind Battle Disc
Pocket Dungeon
Pocke-Kano Yumi
Pocket Family: Happy Family Plan  ポケットファミリー しあわせ家族計画
Pocket Tuner
Pocketan
Pokeler
Pokeler DX Black
Pokeler DX Pink
Pop'n Music 2
Pop'n Music 3 Append Disc
Pop'n Music 4 Append Disc
PoPoRogue
Prologue
Racing Lagoon
RayCrisis (Japanese version)
Remote Control Dandy
R4: Ridge Racer Type 4
Rival Schools 2 (Shiritsu Justice Gakuen Nekketsu Seisyun Nikki 2)
Rockman Complete Works
SaGa Frontier 2
Samurai Shodown : Warriors Rage 2
Saru Get You!
Shop Keeper
Sno Pokeler
Spyro the Dragon (Japanese version)
Spyro 2: Ripto's Rage! (Japanese version)
Street Fighter Alpha 3 (Through Gameshark code)
Street Fighter Zero 3 (Japanese version)
Super Robot Wars Alpha
Tales of Eternia (Japanese version)
Theme Aquarium
Tokimeki Memorial 2
World Neverland 2
World Stadium 3
Yu-Gi-Oh! True Duel Monsters: Sealed Memories

See also
VMU, a similar accessory for the Sega Dreamcast console (which was released 6 months earlier, on July 30, 1998 in Japan).

References

External links
PlayStation.jp entry 

PlayStation (console) accessories
Computer-related introductions in 1999
Products and services discontinued in 2002
Discontinued handheld game consoles
Japan-only video game hardware
Video game storage media
Fifth-generation video game consoles
Monochrome video game consoles
ARM-based video game consoles